Arley may refer to:

Places

England
 Arley, Cheshire, a village
 Arley Hall, Cheshire
 Arley, Warwickshire, a village
 Upper Arley, a village in Worcestershire
 Arley railway station, on the Severn Valley Railway

United States
 Arley, Alabama, a town
 Arley, Missouri, an unincorporated community

People
 Arley (footballer) (born 1986), Brazilian footballer